June Crespo Oyaga (born 1982) is a Spanish artist.

Biography
June Crespo was born in Pamplona in 1982, and earned a licentiate in fine arts from the University of the Basque Country in 2005. For her artistic training she attended the Lupa e Imán Artistic Practice Workshop in San Sebastián in 2005, and the following year, Kunsthaus Bregenz in Austria. In 2014 she trained at the International Artists Studio Program in Stockholm, and from 2015 to 2017, at De Ateliers in Amsterdam.

She works in lithography and drawing, as well as sculpting with materials such as fabric, concrete, fiberglass, plaster, and wax. Her works are part of the collections of the Artium Museum and the Museo Reina Sofía, among others.

Her solo exhibitions include Chance Album n.º1 at etHALL in Barcelona in 2016, and Ser dos at the Galería CarrerasMugica in Bilbao in 2017.

In 2013, Crespo was one of three winners (along with artist Ana Laura Aláez and researcher Adelina Moyano) of the Basque Country government's Gure Artea Awards, receiving an endowment of €25,000. In 2018, she was presented with the Critical Eye Award for Plastic Arts by Radio Nacional de España. This was followed by the Fundación María José Jove's International Art Award in 2019.

Individual exhibitions
 2013: Amatista, Sala Rekalde, Bilbao
 2013: Reverse, Have A Window program, Turín
 2015: Cosa y tú, Galería CarrerasMugica, Bilbao
 2016: Chance Album nº1, etHALL, Barcelona
 2016: Kanala, Intertextual program, MARCO, Vigo
 2017: Ser dos, Galería CarrerasMugica, Bilbao
 2019: No Osso, Certain Lack of Coherence, Porto
 2020: HELMETS, Artium Museum, Vitoria-Gasteiz
 2020 Voy, sí, Galería Heinrich Ehrhardt, Madrid

Awards
 2013: Gure Artea Award
 2018:  for Plastic Arts
 2019: Fundación María José Jove International Art Award

References

External links
 

1982 births
21st-century Spanish sculptors
Living people
People from Pamplona
Spanish women sculptors
University of the Basque Country alumni